Joseph Enakarhire (born 6 November 1982) is a Nigerian former professional footballer. He could play as either a right back or a central defender.

Club career
Born in Warri, Enakarhire impressed at a young age at Standard Liège before moving to Sporting Clube de Portugal in 2004–05, signing a four-year contract and eventually becoming first-choice. However, after just one season, he was sold to Russia's big spenders FC Dynamo Moscow.

Unsettled, Enakarhire was loaned, in August 2006, to Ligue 1 side Bordeaux, as another former Sporting defender, Beto, left for Recreativo de Huelva also on loan. He was relatively used during the campaign and after the French decided against signing him permanently, he joined Greece's Panathinaikos FC on a season-long loan.

In July 2009, Enakarhire had an unsuccessful trial with FC Metz. In the following year, he met the same fate at Odense Boldklub and FC Energie Cottbus.

In late June 2012, after four years out of football, Enakarhire was signed by S.P. La Fiorita to boost the Sammarinese club's first campaign in the UEFA Europa League. In March of the following year he changed teams and countries again, joining Latvian Higher League champions FC Daugava but being released after only four months.

International career
A Nigeria international since 2003, Enakarhire appeared with the Super Eagles at the 2004 and 2006 Africa Cup of Nations. He was an undisputed starter in the latter tournament as the country finished third, only conceding three goals.

References

External links

1982 births
Living people
Sportspeople from Warri
Nigerian footballers
Association football defenders
Belgian Pro League players
Standard Liège players
Primeira Liga players
Sporting CP footballers
Russian Premier League players
FC Dynamo Moscow players
Ligue 1 players
FC Girondins de Bordeaux players
Super League Greece players
Panathinaikos F.C. players
S.P. La Fiorita players
FC Daugava players
Nigeria international footballers
2004 African Cup of Nations players
2006 Africa Cup of Nations players
Nigerian expatriate footballers
Expatriate footballers in Belgium
Expatriate footballers in Portugal
Expatriate footballers in Russia
Expatriate footballers in France
Expatriate footballers in Greece
Expatriate footballers in San Marino
Expatriate footballers in Latvia
Nigerian expatriate sportspeople in Belgium
Nigerian expatriate sportspeople in Latvia